Bradman Best (born 9 August 2001) is an Australian professional rugby league footballer who plays as a  for the Newcastle Knights in the NRL.

Background
Best was born on the Central Coast, New South Wales, Australia and is of Welsh descent.

Best played his junior rugby league for the Woy Woy Roosters, before being signed by the Newcastle Knights.

Best is the son of former Manly Warringah Sea Eagles and London Broncos player Roger Best.

Playing career

Early years
Coming through the Newcastle lower grades, Best also represented the New South Wales under-16s and under-18s sides along the way. At the age of 17, Best was invited to train with Newcastle's NRL squad. In late 2018, he played for the Australian Schoolboys and re-signed with the Newcastle club on a four-year contract until the end of 2022.

2019
In 2019, between injuries, Best split his time playing with Newcastle's Jersey Flegg Cup team and Canterbury Cup NSW team. By August, he turned 18 and was therefore eligible to play NRL. Shortly after, he returned from a foot injury in the Jersey Flegg Cup, scoring three tries and being named man of the match. The following week, in Round 23, he made his NRL debut for the Newcastle club in their 4-46 loss to the Wests Tigers at Campbelltown Stadium. In round 24, he scored his first NRL try in Newcastle's 38-4 win over the Gold Coast Titans at McDonald Jones Stadium in Newcastle.

2020 
Despite scoring two tries in Round 3 against the Penrith Panthers, Best failed to provide an assist to teammate Edrick Lee in the final stages of the match; which ended in a 14-14 draw. In response, Lee and Best practiced one-on-one passing in the lead-up to the Round 4 match against the Canberra Raiders. In the Round 4 match, Best scored another two tries and provided a try assist; which had Lee score the try in a similar scenario to the previous match. After the game, Best sparked instantaneous social media attention, controversially likened to other Australian athletes such as Don Bradman for his performance in Newcastle's 34-18 win over Canberra.

2021
On 27 March, Best was ruled out of action for four weeks with an elbow injury in Newcastle's victory over the New Zealand Warriors.

In round 14, Best was taken from the field in Newcastle's loss against South Sydney and was ruled out for an indefinite period.
Best returned to the Newcastle side for their round 20 match against Canberra. In round 21 against Brisbane, he injured his shoulder during the game and was taken to hospital for scans.

2022
In round 11 of the 2022 NRL season, Best was taken from the field during Newcastle's defeat against Brisbane with a dislocated elbow.  Best was later ruled out from playing for an indefinite period.

On 16 August, it was announced that Best had been stood down from the Newcastle club for not meeting team standards. Best had played in the club's loss against Brisbane in round 22 but failed to make the team bus which was heading to the airport the next morning.

References

External links
Newcastle Knights profile

2001 births
Living people
Australian people of Welsh descent
Australian rugby league players
Newcastle Knights players
Rugby league centres
Rugby league fullbacks
Rugby league players from New South Wales
Rugby league wingers